is a 2008 Japanese animated film produced by ufotable based on The Garden of Sinners novels by Kinoko Nasu. It is the fourth installment in the series, preceded by Remaining Sense of Pain (2008) and followed by Paradox Spiral (2008). Chronologically, the events that occur in The Garden of Sinners: The Hollow Shrine are the second in the timeline of the series.

Plot
Following the events in the second installment, A Study in Murder, Part 1, Shiki is rushed to the hospital for causes revealed in the seventh installment, A Study in Murder, Part 2.

This part of the series is about Shiki's experiences within the void with her male counterpart, SHIKI, and the resulting ability to 'perceive' and  'touch' the 'death' of things in the form of cracks that ran everywhere she looked.

It shows how Toko, Mikiya's employer, and Shiki met as she counsels her about the 'Mystic Eyes of Death Perception'.

It also gives a glimpse of how Mikiya lived two years of his life while Shiki was comatose.

Post credits shows a mysterious man in a dark trench coat visiting three people: Kirie Fujo, Fujino Asagami and a blood-stained guy.

Cast

Maaya Sakamoto as 
Kenichi Suzumura as 
Takako Honda as

References

External links
 
 

2008 films
2008 anime films
Anime composed by Yuki Kajiura
Anime films based on light novels
Japanese animated films
2000s Japanese-language films
Kara no Kyōkai
Ufotable